Slap! is the fourth studio album by anarchist punk band Chumbawamba. A radical redefinition of the band's sound and attitude, the songs now inspires dancing more than moshing, and the lyrics are celebratory as opposed to victimist. The cover art is the popular kitsch painting Chinese Girl (1952) by Vladimir Tretchikoff.

Track listing

Personnel
Lou Watts – vocals, guitar
Dunstan Bruce – vocals, percussion, soprano saxophone
Harry Hamer – drums, percussion
Alice Nutter – vocals
Danbert Nobacon – vocals
Boff Whalley – guitar, vocals, clarinet
Cobie Laan – live recording
Mavis Dillan – bass, trumpet, vocals
Simon "Commonknowledge" Lanzon – keyboards, accordion, piano

Additional personnel
Alan Wilkinson – alto and baritone saxophones
Neil Ferguson – keyboards
Dill – whine
Dere – woof
Mia – vocals
Tanja (formerly Tania) – mouth organ, vocals

Also appearing on the album are Carl Douglas, Elvis Presley, Mark E. Smith, Dagmar Krause, Philip Glass, Adam Ant, Ladysmith Black Mambazo, George Gershwin, Penny Rimbaud, Jake Burns, Rob 'n' Raz, Lenny Bruce, Muszikas Ensemble, Mark Perry, Gang of Four, and Poly Styrene.

References

Chumbawamba albums
1990 albums
One Little Independent Records albums
Agit-Prop Records albums
Virgin Records albums
Reprise Records albums